Stauroneis is a genus of diatoms (Bacillariophyta) with species that occur in fresh and marine water.

Subtaxa
Species, forms and varieties include:

Stauroneis abbottii Chlonoky & G.G.Claus
Stauroneis abbottii f. curta Compère
Stauroneis absaroka Bahls
Stauroneis accedens Lange-Bertalot, Cavacini, Tagliaventi & Alfinito
Stauroneis achnanthoides A.Cleve
Stauroneis acidobionta Lange-Bertalot & Wydrzycka
Stauroneis acidoclinata Lange-Bertalot & Werum
Stauroneis acidoclinatopsis Van de Vijver & Lange-Bertalot
Stauroneis acidojarensis Zidarova, Kopalová & Van de Vijver
Stauroneis acuta W.Smith
Stauroneis acuta f. inflata (Frenguelli) Hustedt
Stauroneis acuta f. tenuis Schaarschmidt
Stauroneis acuta var. americana H.Heiden
Stauroneis acuta var. densestriata Østrup
Stauroneis acuta var. tenuis E.A.Gonzalves & H.P.Gandhi
Stauroneis acuta var. tenuis f. thermalis J.Thomas & E.A.Gonzalves
Stauroneis acuta var. undulata Cleve
Stauroneis acutissima Mann
Stauroneis acutiuscula M.Peragallo & Héribaud-Joseph
Stauroneis adamsiana Metzeltin, Lange-Bertalot & García-Rodríguez
Stauroneis aerophila J.B.Petersen
Stauroneis aethiopica Ehrenberg
Stauroneis aethiopum Ehrenberg
Stauroneis africana Cleve
Stauroneis africana Amossé
Stauroneis africana var. acuminata Grunow
Stauroneis agrestiformis Van de Vijver, Ledeganck & Lange-Bertalot
Stauroneis agrestis J.B.Petersen
Stauroneis agrestis var. inflata H.Kobayasi & K.Ando
Stauroneis akamina Bahls
Stauroneis akrosoensis Foged
Stauroneis alpina Hustedt
Stauroneis alpina var. cuneata Messikommer
Stauroneis altaica Vozzhennikova
Stauroneis americana H.Heiden
Stauroneis amica Lange-Bertalot, Cavacini, Tagliaventi & Alfinito
Stauroneis amicula Lange-Bertalot, Cavacini, Tagliaventi & Alfinito
Stauroneis amphiacantha Ehrenberg
Stauroneis amphibia Lange-Bertalot, Cavacini, Tagliaventi & Alfinito
Stauroneis amphicephala Kützing
Stauroneis amphicephaloides Metzeltin & Lange-Bertalot
Stauroneis amphirhynchus Ehrenberg
Stauroneis amphisbaena Ehrenberg
Stauroneis amplipora Lange-Bertalot, Cavacini, Tagliaventi & Alfinito
Stauroneis anceps Ehrenberg
Stauroneis anceps f. capitata H.P.Gandhi
Stauroneis anceps f. crassa Østrup
Stauroneis anceps f. elliptica Rabenhorst
Stauroneis anceps f. elongata Cleve
Stauroneis anceps f. extrema A.Mayer
Stauroneis anceps f. fossilis (Cleve) Hustedt
Stauroneis anceps f. gracilis Rabenhorst
Stauroneis anceps f. indica H.P.Gandhi
Stauroneis anceps f. intermedia J.Schaarschmidt
Stauroneis anceps f. langirostris (H.Kobayasi) H.Kobayasi & K.Ando
Stauroneis anceps f. lata Font.
Stauroneis anceps f. lata Fontell
Stauroneis anceps f. linearis Rabenhorst
Stauroneis anceps f. major Pantocsek & P.Greguss
Stauroneis anceps f. maxima Istvanfy
Stauroneis anceps f. minor Héribaud-Joseph
Stauroneis anceps f. obtusa (Grunow) Hustedt
Stauroneis anceps f. producta E.A.Gonzalves & H.P.Gandhi
Stauroneis anceps f. robusta Foged
Stauroneis anceps f. subcapitata Østrup
Stauroneis anceps f. tenuicollis Schaarschmidt
Stauroneis anceps var. abnormis Frenguelli
Stauroneis anceps var. affinis Van Heurck
Stauroneis anceps var. alaskana Foged
Stauroneis anceps var. amphicephala Kützing
Stauroneis anceps var. amphicephala f. elongata (Cleve) Ant.Mayer
Stauroneis anceps var. amphicephala f. extrema Ant.Mayer
Stauroneis anceps var. amphilepta Markov
Stauroneis anceps var. ampliata Frenguelli
Stauroneis anceps var. anceps Ehrenberg
Stauroneis anceps var. arctica R.M.Patrick & L.R.Freese
Stauroneis anceps var. argentina (Cleve) Cleve
Stauroneis anceps var. asiatica Skvortzov
Stauroneis anceps var. baikalensis Skvortzov
Stauroneis anceps var. birostris (Ehrenberg) Cleve
Stauroneis anceps var. constricta Manguin
Stauroneis anceps var. crassa Østrup
Stauroneis anceps var. derasa Grunow
Stauroneis anceps var. elliptica Østrup
Stauroneis anceps var. elliptica J.-J.Brun
Stauroneis anceps var. elliptica Unknown authority
Stauroneis anceps var. elongata Cleve
Stauroneis anceps var. fennica A.Cleve
Stauroneis anceps var. gallica (M.Peragallo & Héribaud) A.Cleve
Stauroneis anceps var. genuina Ant.Mayer
Stauroneis anceps var. hankensis Skvortzov
Stauroneis anceps var. hinganica Skvortzov
Stauroneis anceps var. hustedtii H.P.Gandhi
Stauroneis anceps var. javanica Hustedt
Stauroneis anceps var. lanceolata Cleve
Stauroneis anceps var. lata Ant.Mayer
Stauroneis anceps var. lata F.E.Fritsch & M.F.Rich
Stauroneis anceps var. lata West
Stauroneis anceps var. leiostauron A.Cleve
Stauroneis anceps var. linearis (Ehrenberg) J.-J.Brun
Stauroneis anceps var. longirostris H.Kobayasi
Stauroneis anceps var. oblonga Skvortzov
Stauroneis anceps var. orientalis Skvortzov
Stauroneis anceps var. producta Lagerstedt
Stauroneis anceps var. prominula Grunow
Stauroneis anceps var. pusilla A.Cleve
Stauroneis anceps var. recta Cleve
Stauroneis anceps var. rhomboidalis Mayer
Stauroneis anceps var. semiaperta Manguin
Stauroneis anceps var. subrostrata E.E.Gaiser & J.Johansen
Stauroneis anceps var. undulata P.Pero
Stauroneis anceps var. ussuriensis Skvortzov
Stauroneis ancepsfallax Bahls
Stauroneis ancepsopsis Lange-Bertalot, Cavacini, Tagliaventi & Alfinito
Stauroneis ancestralis K.S.Mereschkowsky
Stauroneis angulare E.A.Gonzalves & H.P.Gandhi
Stauroneis angulata C.Johnston
Stauroneis angusta Ehrenberg
Stauroneis angustevittata Reichardt
Stauroneis angustilancea Lange-Bertalot & Metzeltin
Stauroneis antadiluviana Héribaud-Joseph
Stauroneis arctica Hustedt
Stauroneis arctorussica Van de Vijver & Lange-Bertalot
Stauroneis atacamae Hustedt
Stauroneis atacamae f. major Frenguelli
Stauroneis atacamai var. fuegensis A.Cleve
Stauroneis atlantica Ehrenberg
Stauroneis attenuirostris R.M.Patrick & Freese
Stauroneis aueri (Krasske) Lange-Bertalot
Stauroneis australis Greville
Stauroneis australobtusa Zidarova, Kopalová & Van de Vijver
Stauroneis baccata G.Leuduger-Fortmorel
Stauroneis baikalensis Skvortzow [Skvortsov]
Stauroneis baileyi Ehrenberg
Stauroneis balatonis Pantocsek
Stauroneis barrowiana R.M.Patrick & Freese
Stauroneis bathurstensis M.H.Giffen
Stauroneis beeskovea Bahls
Stauroneis beltranii Metzeltin, Lange-Bertalot & García-Rodríguez
Stauroneis bertrandii Van de Vijver & Lange-Bertalot
Stauroneis beyensii Van de Vijver & Lange-Bertalot
Stauroneis bicuneata Metzeltin & Lange-Bertalot
Stauroneis bifissa Østrup
Stauroneis binodis Ehrenberg
Stauroneis biundulata A.Cleve
Stauroneis blanda Metzeltin & Lange-Bertalot
Stauroneis blazenciciae Levkov, Tofilovska, Jovanovska, Cvetkoska & Metzeltin
Stauroneis bolonensis Barinova
Stauroneis borgei Manguin
Stauroneis borrichii (J.B.Petersen) J.W.G.Lund
Stauroneis borrichii var. subcapitata (J.B.Petersen) J.W.G.Lund
Stauroneis boryana Pantocsek
Stauroneis bottnica A.Cleve
Stauroneis boudetii M.Persoon
Stauroneis bovbjergii Reimer
Stauroneis boyntoniae Bahls
Stauroneis brasiliensis Metzeltin & H-Lange-Bertalot
Stauroneis brebissonii F.S.Castracane degli Antelminelli
Stauroneis brevirostris Ehrenberg
Stauroneis brevis (Dippel) Metzeltin & Lange-Bertalot
Stauroneis bryocola Van de Vijver & Lange-Bertalot
Stauroneis bulla J.R.Carter & P.Denny
Stauroneis calcuttensis Skvortzov
Stauroneis capensis Ehrenberg
Stauroneis capitata (Ehrenberg) Kützing
Stauroneis capula J.R.Carter & P.Denny
Stauroneis carinata H.Heiden
Stauroneis cataractae Gerd Moser
Stauroneis catharinae Van de Vijver & Lange-Bertalot
Stauroneis catharinella Van de Vijver & Lange-Bertalot
Stauroneis cavalcantei Tremarin, Tusset & T.Ludwig
Stauroneis charcotii M.Peragallo
Stauroneis charlesreimeri Lange-Bertalot & Metzeltin
Stauroneis charrua Metzeltin, Lange-Bertalot & García-Rodríguez
Stauroneis chasei Cholnoky
Stauroneis chilensis Frenguelli
Stauroneis chinensis Skvortzow [Skvortzov]
Stauroneis chilensis f. elliptica Frenguelli
Stauroneis cimbebasiae Cholnoky
Stauroneis circumborealis Lange-Bertalot & Krammer
Stauroneis circumborealoides Van de Vijver & Lange-Bertalot
Stauroneis claasseniae Cholnoky
Stauroneis clandestina Lange-Bertalot & Van de Vijver
Stauroneis clarkii Bahls
Stauroneis concapta B.J.Chlonoky
Stauroneis conspicua Metzeltin & Lange-Bertalot
Stauroneis constricta Cleve
Stauroneis constricta Ehrenberg
Stauroneis cornuta G.Leuduger-Fortmorel
Stauroneis correntina Frenguelli
Stauroneis costaricana Metzeltin & Lange-Bertalot
Stauroneis costata O'Meara
Stauroneis crassula Van de Vijver & Lange-Bertalot
Stauroneis crumenifera A.Mayer
Stauroneis cuneata Manguin
Stauroneis dahomensis Hustedt
Stauroneis dakariensis Guermeur
Stauroneis decora Greville
Stauroneis decurrens Ehrenberg
Stauroneis delicata Zidarova, Kopalová & Van de Vijver
Stauroneis delicatula G.Leuduger-Fortmorel
Stauroneis demdrobates (Ehrenberg) Ralfs
Stauroneis demerarae Cleve
Stauroneis dendrobates (Ehrenberg) Ralfs
Stauroneis densestriata Hustedt
Stauroneis deperdita Manguin
Stauroneis desiderata Cleve
Stauroneis desiderata f. rostrata Kisselev
Stauroneis dicephala Ehrenberg
Stauroneis didacta J.R.Carter & P.Denny
Stauroneis dilatata Ehrenberg
Stauroneis dilatata f. baicalensis Skvortzov & K.I.Mey.
Stauroneis dilatata var. minutissima Manguin
Stauroneis distinguenda Hustedt
Stauroneis distinguenda var. capitata Krasske
Stauroneis distinguenda var. ventricosa Krasske
Stauroneis dorsiventralis Kulikovskiy, Metzeltin & Lange-Bertalot
Stauroneis dracomontana Cholnoky
Stauroneis dubia W.Gregory
Stauroneis dubitabilior Metzeltin & Lange-Bertalot
Stauroneis edgarii Kociolek
Stauroneis ehrenbergii Ralfs
Stauroneis eichhornii J.Schumann
Stauroneis elegantula Østrup
Stauroneis elenae Kulikovskiy, Lange-Bertalot & A.Witkowski
Stauroneis elisa Lange-Bertalot, Cavacini, Tagliaventi & Alfinito
Stauroneis emorsa Pantocsek
Stauroneis engelbrechtii Cholnoky
Stauroneis erythraea Grunow
Stauroneis euglypta Ehrenberg
Stauroneis eurysoma (Ehrenberg) Ehrenberg
Stauroneis eurysoma Ehrenberg
Stauroneis excellens J.A.M.Perty
Stauroneis exilissima M.H.Giffen
Stauroneis explicata J.A.M.Perty
Stauroneis fenestra Ehrenberg
Stauroneis fenestra var. amphirhynchus P.Petit
Stauroneis finlandia Bahls
Stauroneis flexuosa M.M.Salah
Stauroneis fluminea R.M.Patrick & Freese
Stauroneis fluminea var. alaskaensis Foged
Stauroneis fluminopsis Van de Vijver & Lange-Bertalot
Stauroneis folium Ehrenberg
Stauroneis fonticola Hustedt
Stauroneis francisci-josefi Van de Vijver & Lange-Bertalot
Stauroneis franconica A.Mayer
Stauroneis frauenfeldiana (Grunow) Cleve
Stauroneis frickei H.Heiden
Stauroneis frickei var. angusta C.S.Boyer
Stauroneis fridericiana Lange-Bertalot
Stauroneis fuegiana Casa & Van de Vijver
Stauroneis fulmen Brightwell
Stauroneis fulmen var. capitata Heiden
Stauroneis fusiformis K.E.Lohman & G.W.Andrews
Stauroneis gaiserae Metzeltin & Lange-Bertalot
Stauroneis galapagica Ehrenberg
Stauroneis gallica M.Peragallo & Héribaud-Joseph
Stauroneis gelida Van de Vijver & Lange-Bertalot
Stauroneis gibbosa Ehrenberg
Stauroneis gieskesii Cholnoky
Stauroneis glacialis F.S.Castracane degli Antelminelli
Stauroneis glacialis H.Heiden
Stauroneis glangeaudii Héribaud-Joseph
Stauroneis gossmanniae Metzeltin & Lange-Bertalot
Stauroneis graciliopsis Metzeltin & Lange-Bertalot
Stauroneis gracilior E.Reichardt
Stauroneis gracilis Ehrenberg
Stauroneis gracilis f. bicapitellata A.Cleve
Stauroneis gracilis var. argentina Cleve
Stauroneis gracilis var. argentina Cleve
Stauroneis gracillima Hustedt
Stauroneis grani E.G.Jørgensen
Stauroneis granulata (Ehrenberg) Ralfs
Stauroneis gregoryi Ralfs
Stauroneis gregori var. hankensis Skvortzov
Stauroneis gregorii f. linearis Hustedt
Stauroneis gregorii var. densestriata Hustedt
Stauroneis gregorii var. obtusiuscula Grunow
Stauroneis gremmenii Van de Vijver & Lange-Bertalot
Stauroneis groenlandica Østrup
Stauroneis grunowii G.Rabenhorst
Stauroneis guslyakovii Genkal & Yarushina
Stauroneis halmei K.Mölder
Stauroneis hannae R.M.Patrick & L.R.Freese
Stauroneis harrisonii Cholnoky
Stauroneis harrisonii var. triangularis Cleve
Stauroneis hartzii Østrup
Stauroneis hasta Metzeltin & Lange-Bertalot
Stauroneis heidenii Forti
Stauroneis heimii P.Guermeur & Manguin
Stauroneis heinii Lange-Bertalot & Krammer
Stauroneis hercynica Krasske
Stauroneis hercynica var. major R.M.Patrick & Freese
Stauroneis heribaudii A.Lauby
Stauroneis heufleri (Grunow) Grunow
Stauroneis hickeni Frenguelli
Stauroneis hochstetteri Ehrenberg
Stauroneis hologramma Ehrenberg
Stauroneis hustedtii Simonsen ex Hustedt
Stauroneis husvikensis Van de Vijver & Lange-Bertalot
Stauroneis huttonii J.Inglis
Stauroneis hyalina Juhlin-Dannfelt
Stauroneis hyi Héribaud-Joseph
Stauroneis hyperborea Lange-Bertalot & Krammer
Stauroneis ignorata Hustedt
Stauroneis ignorata var. rupestris (Skvortzov) C.W.Reimer
Stauroneis impenda J.R.Carter & P.Denny
Stauroneis inaequalis Ehrenberg
Stauroneis inanis J.A.M.Perty
Stauroneis incisa Voigt
Stauroneis incurvata Rochoux d'Aubert
Stauroneis indianopsis Bahls
Stauroneis indica Ehrenberg
Stauroneis indistincta Cholnoky
Stauroneis inflata Heiden
Stauroneis intricans van de Vijver & Lange-Bertalot
Stauroneis irinae Kulikovskiy, Lange-Bertalot & Metzeltin
Stauroneis italica Lange-Bertalot, Cavacini, Tagliaventi & Alfinito
Stauroneis jamesrossensis Zidarova, Kopalová & Van de Vijver
Stauroneis janischii Rabenhorst
Stauroneis jarensis Lange-Bertalot, Cavacini, Tagliaventi & Alfinito
Stauroneis javanica (Grunow) Cleve
Stauroneis javanica var. arvernense Héribaud-Joseph
Stauroneis javanica var. kerguelensis H.Heiden
Stauroneis javanica var. oblonga Østrup
Stauroneis javanica var. truncata Østrup
Stauroneis johanseni A.H.Mackay
Stauroneis joignerezii Fusey
Stauroneis karelica K.Mölder
Stauroneis karstenii Hustedt
Stauroneis karstica Tusset, Tremarin & T.Ludwig
Stauroneis kingstonii Burge, Marsico & Edlund
Stauroneis kirtikarii P.T.Sarode & N.D.Kamat
Stauroneis kishinena Bahls
Stauroneis kochiae Metzeltin & Lange-Bertalot
Stauroneis koeltzii Metzeltin, A.Witkowski & Lange-Bertalot
Stauroneis koniamboensis (Manguin ex Kociolek & Reviers) Gerd Moser
Stauroneis kootenai Bahls
Stauroneis krasskei Cholnoky
Stauroneis kriegeri R.M.Patrick
Stauroneis kriegeri f. lanceolata H.Kobayasi & K.Ando
Stauroneis kriegeri f. undulata Hustedt
Stauroneis kryophila Grunow
Stauroneis kuelbsii Lange-Bertalot
Stauroneis lacunae Cholnoky
Stauroneis lacusvulcani P.Rioual
Stauroneis lanceolata Kützing
Stauroneis lapidicola J.B.Petersen
Stauroneis lardonii Van de Vijver
Stauroneis laterostrata Hustedt
Stauroneis laticeps Hustedt
Stauroneis laticeps var. constricta F.Meister
Stauroneis latistauros Van de Vijver & Lange-Bertalot
Stauroneis lecohui Van de Vijver & Lange-Bertalot
Stauroneis legeri Hustedt
Stauroneis legumen (Ehrenberg) Kützing
Stauroneis legumen f. parva Grunow
Stauroneis legumen var. balatonis Pantocsek
Stauroneis legumen var. elliptica H.Kobayasi & K.Ando
Stauroneis legumen var. integra Manguin
Stauroneis legumen var. nipponica (Skvortzov) H.Kobayasi & K.Ando
Stauroneis legumen var. parva H.Peragallo
Stauroneis leguminiformis Lange-Bertalot & Krammer
Stauroneis leguminopsis Lange-Bertalot & Krammer
Stauroneis leonardii Compère
Stauroneis lepchae N.Wadmare, S.Roy, Kociolek & B.Karthick
Stauroneis lesothensis F.R.Schoeman
Stauroneis lewisii Bahls
Stauroneis lignitica Hustedt
Stauroneis limnetica Kociolek
Stauroneis lindigiana (Grunow) Cleve
Stauroneis lineolata Ehrenberg
Stauroneis liostauron Ehrenberg
Stauroneis livingstonii C.W.Reimer
Stauroneis lorami Frenguelli
Stauroneis lucida J.-J.Brun
Stauroneis lundii Hustedt
Stauroneis lychnidis A.Jurilj
Stauroneis mackintoshii O'Meara
Stauroneis macrocephala Kützing
Stauroneis madagascariensis Metzeltin & Lange-Bertalot
Stauroneis maeotica Pantocsek
Stauroneis maeotica var. minor Pantocsek
Stauroneis manguini Guermeur
Stauroneis margaritorae Lange-Bertalot, Cavacini, Tagliaventi & Alfinito
Stauroneis marina Hustedt
Stauroneis maunakeaensis J.Massey
Stauroneis medioasiatica Metzeltin, Lange-Bertalot & Nergui
Stauroneis mediterranea Lange-Bertalot & Van de Vijver
Stauroneis megaphyllodes Metzeltin & Lange-Bertalot
Stauroneis melchiori Frenguelli & Orlando
Stauroneis meniscus J.Schumann
Stauroneis mesogongyla (Ehrenberg) Ralfs
Stauroneis mesopachya (Ehrenberg) Ehrenberg
Stauroneis mesopachya f. minor A.Lauby
Stauroneis microbtusa Reichardt
Stauroneis microproducta Van de Vijver & Lange-Bertalot
Stauroneis minima Voigt
Stauroneis minor (Østrup) Cleve-Euler
Stauroneis minuta Kützing
Stauroneis minutissima Lagerstedt
Stauroneis minutula Kützing
Stauroneis minutula Hustedt
Stauroneis minutula var. linearis Hustedt
Stauroneis miyakoensis A.Tuji
Stauroneis modestissima Metzeltin, Lange-Bertalot & García-Rodríguez
Stauroneis mongoliarum Metzeltin & Lange-Bertalot
Stauroneis monogramma Ehrenberg
Stauroneis monotica Cholnoky
Stauroneis muriella J.W.G.Lund
Stauroneis muriella f. capitata J.W.G.Lund
Stauroneis muriella f. linearis J.W.G.Lund
Stauroneis muriella f. triundulata J.W.G.Lund
Stauroneis nathorstii Foged
Stauroneis navrongensis Foged
Stauroneis nebulosa (Krasske) Lange-Bertalot
Stauroneis neo-ebudica Manguin
Stauroneis neobudica Manguin
Stauroneis neocaledonica Manguin
Stauroneis neofossilis Lange-Bertalot & Metzeltin
Stauroneis neohyalina Lange-Bertalot & Krammer
Stauroneis neosiberica Metzeltin & Lange-Bertalot
Stauroneis neotropica Metzeltin & Lange-Bertalot
Stauroneis nikolayi Zidarova
Stauroneis nobilis Schumann
Stauroneis nobilis f. alabamae (Heiden) A.Cleve
Stauroneis nobilis f. densestriata H.Kobayasi & K.Ando
Stauroneis nobilis f. rostrata (H.Heiden) H.Kobayasi
Stauroneis nobilis var. baconiana (Stodder) C.W.Reimer
Stauroneis nobilis var. capitata H.Kobayasi
Stauroneis nobilis var. gracilis H.Kobayasi
Stauroneis nobilis var. minima Foged
Stauroneis nodulosa H.Heiden
Stauroneis nonotica Cholnoky
Stauroneis nugsuagensis Foged
Stauroneis nugsuaquensis Foged
Stauroneis obesa Greville
Stauroneis oblonga Grunow
Stauroneis oblongella H.Heiden
Stauroneis obscura T.Marsson
Stauroneis obtusa Lagerstedt
Stauroneis obtusa f. indica E.A.Gonzalves & H.P.Gandhi
Stauroneis obtusa var. catarinensis Krasske
Stauroneis obtusa var. chemburiana E.A.Gonzalves & H.P.Gandhi
Stauroneis obtusa var. lapponica f. minor Krasske
Stauroneis obtusa var. medioundata Manguin
Stauroneis obtusa var. minor V.Zanon
Stauroneis obtusa var. nagpurensis P.T.Sarode & N.D.Kamat
Stauroneis obtuserostrata (Hustedt) M.Poulin
Stauroneis okamurae Skvortzov
Stauroneis okamurae var. lanceolata Skvortzov
Stauroneis olympica Hustedt
Stauroneis ovalis W.Gregory
Stauroneis ovata (Grunow) Cleve
Stauroneis pacifica F.S.Castracane degli Antelminelli
Stauroneis pacifica var. minor H.F.Van Heurck
Stauroneis pallida T.Marsson
Stauroneis paludosa Kulikovskiy, Lange-Bertalot, Witkowski & Dorofeyuk
Stauroneis paludosa Kulikovskiy, Lange-Bertalot, A.Witkowski & N.I.Dorofeyuk
Stauroneis panduriformis Østrup
Stauroneis parajavanica Lange-Bertalot, Cavacini, Tagliaventi & Alfinito
Stauroneis parajavanica var. mongolica Metzeltin, Lange-Bertalot & S.Nergui
Stauroneis parallela H.Heiden
Stauroneis parallelistriata H.Kobayasi
Stauroneis parasubgracilis Metzeltin & Lange-Bertalot
Stauroneis parathermicola Lange-Bertalot
Stauroneis partabgarhensis H.P.Gandhi
Stauroneis parva (Ehrenberg) Kützing
Stauroneis parva var. gracilior Kützing
Stauroneis parviporis Metzeltin & Lange-Bertalot
Stauroneis parvula (Grunow) Cleve
Stauroneis parvula f. major J.B.Petersen
Stauroneis parvula f. subcapitata Østrup
Stauroneis parvula var. attenuata D.McCall
Stauroneis parvula var. capitata Østrup
Stauroneis parvula var. lanceolata Skvortzov
Stauroneis parvula var. ruptestris Skvortzov
Stauroneis parvula var. undulata T.F.Vozzhennikova
Stauroneis parvulissima Krammer & Lange-Bertalot
Stauroneis paucicostata (Rabenhorst) Ralfs
Stauroneis pax Bahls
Stauroneis peckii (G.Rabenhorst) Ralfs
Stauroneis pellucida Cleve/Stodder
Stauroneis pellucida f. arctica Cleve
Stauroneis pellucida f. mediterranea Cleve
Stauroneis pellucida var. contracta Østrup
Stauroneis pellucida var. cuneata Østrup
Stauroneis pellucida var. orientalis Skvortzov
Stauroneis pellucida var. pleurosigmoidea Østrup
Stauroneis peregrins (Ehrenberg) Ralfs
Stauroneis perexilis Østrup
Stauroneis pergracilis Van de Vijver & Lange-Bertalot
Stauroneis perlucens Østrup
Stauroneis perminuta Grunow
Stauroneis perpusilla Grunow
Stauroneis perpusilla var. obtusiuscula Grunow
Stauroneis phoenicenteron (Nitzsch) Ehrenberg - type species
Stauroneis pheonicenteron var. baicalensis Skvortzov & K.I.Meyer
Stauroneis phoenicenteron f. alaskana Foged
Stauroneis phoenicenteron f. angulata Hustedt
Stauroneis phoenicenteron f. baicalensis Skvortzov & K.I.Meyer
Stauroneis phoenicenteron f. brevis (Dippel) Hustedt
Stauroneis phoenicenteron f. brunii (M.Peragallo & Héribaud) M.Voigt
Stauroneis phoenicenteron f. capitata E.A.Gonzalves & H.P.Gandhi
Stauroneis phoenicenteron f. crassa M.Peragallo & Héribaud-Joseph
Stauroneis phoenicenteron f. curta Skvortzov
Stauroneis phoenicenteron f. dippelii N.Woodhead & R.D.Tweed
Stauroneis phoenicenteron f. genuina Hustedt
Stauroneis phoenicenteron f. gracilis Hustedt
Stauroneis phoenicenteron f. hankensis Skvortzov
Stauroneis phoenicenteron f. intermedia Dippel
Stauroneis phoenicenteron f. lanceolata (Kützing) Hustedt
Stauroneis phoenicenteron f. minima Foged
Stauroneis phoenicenteron f. minor Rabenhorst
Stauroneis phoenicenteron f. nipponica Skvortzov
Stauroneis phoenicenteron f. oblongella (Skvortzov) H.Kobayasi
Stauroneis phoenicenteron f. producta H.P.Gandhi
Stauroneis phoenicenteron f. producta West
Stauroneis phoenicenteron f. truncata Dippel
Stauroneis phoenicenteron var. gracilis A.Mann
Stauroneis phoenicenteron var. agapica N.A.Skabichevskaja
Stauroneis phoenicenteron var. angustior Pantocsek
Stauroneis phoenicenteron var. baileyi (Ehrenberg) Cleve
Stauroneis phoenicenteron var. ceylonica Skvortzov
Stauroneis phoenicenteron var. correntina Frenguelli
Stauroneis phoenicenteron var. elegans G.A.Prowse
Stauroneis phoenicenteron var. genuina Cleve
Stauroneis phoenicenteron var. genuina f. lanceolata (Kützing) Ant.Mayer
Stauroneis phoenicenteron var. gracilis Brun & M.Peragallo
Stauroneis phoenicenteron var. gracilis Dippel
Stauroneis phoenicenteron var. hankensis Skvortzov
Stauroneis phoenicenteron var. hattorii Tsumura
Stauroneis phoenicenteron var. intermedia (Dippel) A.Cleve
Stauroneis phoenicenteron var. lanceolata (Kützing) Cleve
Stauroneis phoenicenteron var. lanceolata (Kützing) J.-J.Brun
Stauroneis phoenicenteron var. lanceolata f. major Héribaud-Joseph
Stauroneis phoenicenteron var. latestriata A.Cleve
Stauroneis phoenicenteron var. linearis (Ehrenberg) Hustedt
Stauroneis phoenicenteron var. oblongella Skvortzov
Stauroneis phoenicenteron var. prolongata A.Cleve
Stauroneis phoenicenteron var. signata F.Meister
Stauroneis phoenicenteron var. vulgaris f. hankensis Skvortzov
Stauroneis phoenicenteron var. vulgaris f. intermedia Dippel
Stauroneis phoenicenteron var. vulgaris Dippel
Stauroneis phoenicenteron var. yberiana Frenguelli
Stauroneis phyllodes Ehrenberg
Stauroneis phyllodes var. intermedia A.Amossé
Stauroneis phyllodes var. obtusa Østrup
Stauroneis phyllodes var. obtusa f. minor A.Cleve
Stauroneis pikuni Bahls
Stauroneis placentula Ehrenberg
Stauroneis platalea (Ehrenberg) Ehrenberg
Stauroneis platystoma Ehrenberg
Stauroneis playfairiana Skvortzov
Stauroneis plicata C.Brockmann
Stauroneis polymorpha Lagerstedt
Stauroneis polynesiae (J.-J.Brun) Hustedt
Stauroneis poretzkii Popova
Stauroneis producta Grunow
Stauroneis producta f. minor Foged
Stauroneis prominula (Grunow ex Cleve) Hustedt
Stauroneis pseudagrestis Lange-Bertalot & Werum
Stauroneis pseudoagrestis Lange-Bertalot & Werum
Stauroneis pseudomuriella Van de Vijver & Lange-Bertalot
Stauroneis pseudoschimanskii Van de Vijver & Lange-Bertalot
Stauroneis pseudoseptata T.A.Bond
Stauroneis pseudosmithii Van de Vijver & Lange-Bertalot
Stauroneis pseudosubobtusoides H.Germain
Stauroneis pseudotenera H.Kobayasi & K.Ando
Stauroneis pseudothermicola Cholnoky
Stauroneis pteroidea Ehrenberg
Stauroneis pumila Kützing
Stauroneis punensis Lange-Bertalot & U.Rumrich
Stauroneis pusilla Ehrenberg
Stauroneis pusilla Grunow
Stauroneis pygmea Castracane
Stauroneis pygmaea f. undulata Hustedt
Stauroneis pygmaea var. africana Cholnoky
Stauroneis pygmaea var. densestriata Cholnoky
Stauroneis quadrata Héribaud-Joseph
Stauroneis quadripedis (Cleve-Euler) Hendey
Stauroneis quadripedis A.Cleve
Stauroneis quarnerensis Grunow
Stauroneis rabenhorstii Ralfs
Stauroneis radissonii M.Poulin & A.Cardinal
Stauroneis recondita Krasske
Stauroneis regina Bahls
Stauroneis reichardtii Lange-Bertalot, Cavacini, Tagliaventi & Alfinito
Stauroneis reichardtiopsis Zidarova, Kopalová & Van de Vijver
Stauroneis reicheltii Heiden
Stauroneis resoluta Gerd Moser
Stauroneis respectabilis Lange-Bertalot, Cavacini, Tagliaventi & Alfinito
Stauroneis retrostauron (A.Mann) F.Meister
Stauroneis rex Bahls
Stauroneis rhombica O'Meara
Stauroneis rhombus Østrup
Stauroneis robusta Petit
Stauroneis roraimae (Ehrenberg) Ralfs
Stauroneis rostrata (Hustedt) Metzeltin & Lange-Bertalot
Stauroneis rostrifera E.Reichardt
Stauroneis rotundata Greville
Stauroneis ruacanae Cholnoky
Stauroneis rupestris Skvortzow [Skvortzov]
Stauroneis rusticula Van de Vijver & Lange-Bertalot
Stauroneis sacajaweae Bahls
Stauroneis sagitta Cleve
Stauroneis salebrosa V.A.Nikolajev
Stauroneis salsa R.M.Patrick & Freese
Stauroneis salsa var. elliptica R.M.Patrick & L.R.Freese
Stauroneis saprophila M.Rybak, T.Noga & L.Ector
Stauroneis scandinavica Lagerstedt
Stauroneis scaphulaeformis Greville
Stauroneis schimanskii Krammer
Stauroneis schinzii (Brun) Cleve
Stauroneis schinzii var. argentina Frenguelli
Stauroneis schinzii var. maxima Frenguelli
Stauroneis schinzii var. nyassensis O.Müller
Stauroneis schmidiae R.Jahn & N.Abarca
Stauroneis schroederi Hustedt
Stauroneis schroederi f. capitata I.Szalai
Stauroneis schulzii Jousé
Stauroneis semen Ehrenberg
Stauroneis semiaperta (Manguin) Metzeltin & Lange-Bertalot
Stauroneis senegalensis Guermeur
Stauroneis separanda Lange-Bertalot & Werum
Stauroneis siberica (Grunow) Lange-Bertalot & Krammer
Stauroneis siberica var. papilionacea Van de Vijver & Lange-Bertalot
Stauroneis sieboldii Ehrenberg
Stauroneis sigma Ehrenberg
Stauroneis signata (F.Meister) Skvortzov
Stauroneis signata f. gracilis Skvortzov
Stauroneis signata Frenguelli
Stauroneis sikkimensis N.Wadmare, S.Roy, Kociolek & B.Karthick
Stauroneis silvahassiaca Lange-Bertalot & Werum
Stauroneis similaris R.Hagelstein
Stauroneis simulans (Donkin) R.Ross
Stauroneis singula J.R.Carter & P.Denny
Stauroneis skabitschewskyi Kulikovskiy, Lange-Bertalot & Metzeltin
Stauroneis slateri Foged
Stauroneis smithiana Grunow
Stauroneis smithii Grunow
Stauroneis smithii f. acuminata Cleve-Euler
Stauroneis smithii f. fontinalis Foged
Stauroneis smithii var. borgei (Manguin) Hustedt
Stauroneis smithii var. elliptica Hustedt
Stauroneis smithii var. incisa Pantocsek
Stauroneis smithii var. karelica Wislouch & Kolbe
Stauroneis smithii var. minima Haworth
Stauroneis smithii var. minor P.Fusey
Stauroneis smithii var. perlucens (Østrup) M.E.K.Møller
Stauroneis smithii var. rhombica F.Meister
Stauroneis smithii var. smithii Grunow
Stauroneis sofia Van de Vijver & Lange-Bertalot
Stauroneis sonyae Kulikovskiy, Lange-Bertalot, Witkowski & Dorofeyuk
Stauroneis soodensis (Krasske) Cholnoky
Stauroneis spauldingiae Bahls
Stauroneis sphaerophora Ehrenberg
Stauroneis sphaerophoron Ehrenberg
Stauroneis sphagnicola Krasske
Stauroneis sphagnophila Krasske
Stauroneis sphagnophila f. usterii Krasske
Stauroneis spicula Cleve & Grunow
Stauroneis staurolineata C.W.Reimer
Stauroneis staurolineata var. japonica H.Kobayasi & K.Ando
Stauroneis staurophaena Ehrenberg
Stauroneis stellae Lange-Bertalot, Cavacini, Tagliaventi & Alfinito
Stauroneis stodderi Greenleaf
Stauroneis stodderi var. japonica H.Kobayasi
Stauroneis strelnikovae Lange-Bertalot & Van de Vijver
Stauroneis subalpina J.R.Carter
Stauroneis subaustralis Van de Vijver & Lange-Bertalot
Stauroneis subborealis Bahls
Stauroneis subdahomensis Guermeur
Stauroneis subdahomensis var. lanceolata Guermeur
Stauroneis subgracilis Lange-Bertalot & Krammer
Stauroneis subgraclior Lange-Bertalot, Cavacini, Tagliaventi & Alfinito
Stauroneis subhyperborea Van de Vijver & Lange-Bertalot
Stauroneis submarginalis Bahls
Stauroneis submarina Hustedt
Stauroneis subobtusa Hustedt
Stauroneis subtilis Manguin
Stauroneis subtropica Cholnoky
Stauroneis subula Ehrenberg
Stauroneis sulcata Cleve
Stauroneis superacuta Lange-Bertalot, Metzeltin & Van de Vijver
Stauroneis supergracilis Van de Vijver & Lange-Bertalot
Stauroneis superhyperborea Van de Vijver, Beyens & Lange-Bertalot
Stauroneis superkuelbsii Bahls
Stauroneis suranii Metzeltin Lange-Bertalot & Nergui
Stauroneis svalbardensis Van de Vijver & Lange-Bertalot
Stauroneis sylviabonillae Metzeltin, Lange-Bertalot & García-Rodríguez
Stauroneis szontaghii Pantocsek
Stauroneis tackei (Hustedt) Krammer & Lange-Bertalot
Stauroneis tamnaeana Guermeur
Stauroneis tatrica R.Gutwinski
Stauroneis tenera Hustedt
Stauroneis tenuis H.P.Gandhi
Stauroneis tenuissima Hustedt
Stauroneis terryi D.B.Ward ex T.C.Palmer
Stauroneis thaitiana Castracane
Stauroneis thaitiana var. polynesiae J.-J.Brun
Stauroneis thermicola (J.B.Petersen) J.W.G.Lund
Stauroneis thermicola var. elongata J.W.G.Lund
Stauroneis thermicoloides Van de Vijver & Lange-Bertalot
Stauroneis thienemanni Hustedt
Stauroneis thienemannii Hustedt
Stauroneis thompsonii Bahls
Stauroneis tibestiana Guermeur
Stauroneis tibetica K.S.Mereschkowsky
Stauroneis triundulata Cholnoky
Stauroneis tropicalis Guermeur
Stauroneis tropicalis var. undulata Guermeur
Stauroneis truncata (Rabenhorst) Ralfs
Stauroneis truncata H.P.Gandhi
Stauroneis tumida J.Schumann
Stauroneis tumidula Grunow
Stauroneis turfosa Tarnavschi & Jitariu
Stauroneis turfosa var. reimeri P.Rivera
Stauroneis tylophora H.Reichelt
Stauroneis tyrrhenica Lange-Bertalot, Cavacini, Tagliaventi & Alfinito
Stauroneis undata Hustedt
Stauroneis undosa Ehrenberg
Stauroneis undulata Hilse
Stauroneis ursamaioris Lange-Bertalot & Van de Vijver
Stauroneis valderostrata Metzeltin & Lange-Bertalot
Stauroneis valeriana Metzeltin, Lange-Bertalot & García-Rodríguez
Stauroneis vandevijveri Bahls
Stauroneis ventriosus Metzeltin & Lange-Bertalot
Stauroneis ventricosa var. explicata (J.A.M.Perty) G.Rabenhorst
Stauroneis verbania G.De Notaris
Stauroneis vesca K.E.Lohman & G.W.Andrews
Stauroneis vibrio Ehrenberg
Stauroneis virginica Ehrenberg
Stauroneis visenda Brown
Stauroneis vixacuta Lange-Bertalot & Metzeltin
Stauroneis vladivostokensis Skvortzov
Stauroneis washingtonia A.Mann
Stauroneis wipplingeri Cholnoky
Stauroneis wislouchi Poretzky & Anisimova
Stauroneis wislouchii f. parva V.S.Poretzky & Anisimova
Stauroneis zackenbergensis Van de Vijver & Lange-Bertalot
Stauroneis zairensis Compère

References

Naviculales
Diatom genera
Taxa named by Christian Gottfried Ehrenberg